Humberto Sousa Medeiros, GCIH (October 6, 1915 – September 17, 1983) was a Portuguese-American clergyman of the Roman Catholic Church. He served as Archbishop of Boston from 1970 until his death in 1983, and was created a cardinal in 1973. An ecclesiastical conservative, Cardinal Medeiros was considered a champion of the immigrant worker, the poor and minorities.

Medeiros transferred John Geoghan from parish to parish despite multiple credible accusations of sexual abuse. He knew of dozens of sexual abuse accusations against Paul Shanley. Medeiros himself was accused of sexual impropriety posthumously both by Shanley and Gerry Garland, a former hockey star at Catholic Memorial High School.

Early life
Humberto Sousa Medeiros was born in Arrifes, on the island of São Miguel, Azores, to Antonio Medeiros and Maria de Jesus Sousa Massa Flor. He was baptized in the parish of Nossa Senhora da Saúde on November 1, 1915. His father raised vegetables and ran a small variety store until 1931, when the family emigrated to the United States and settled in Fall River, Massachusetts. The family attended St. Michael's Church, the local Portuguese parish.

Forced to leave school at age 16, Humberto swept floors in a local textile mill for 62 cents a day, studying English in his spare time. He was able to return to school in 1935, when his younger brothers became old enough to work to support the family. After graduating first in his class from B.M.C. Durfee High School in 1937, he entered the Catholic University of America. He became a naturalized citizen and obtained a Master of Philosophy degree in 1942 and a Licentiate of Sacred Theology in 1946.

Priesthood
Medeiros was ordained to the priesthood by Bishop James Edwin Cassidy on June 15, 1946. He then returned to the Diocese of Fall River, where he was assigned to St. John of God Church in Somerset. In 1949, he returned to Catholic University to pursue his doctoral studies. He earned a Doctor of Sacred Theology from the Pontifical Gregorian University in Rome in 1952. After returning to Fall River, he was assigned to Holy Name Church and named assistant chancellor of the diocese. He later served as vicar for religious, vice-chancellor, and finally chancellor, during which time he was elevated to the title of Monsignor in 1958. He became pastor of St. Michael's Church in 1960 at which stage he finally mastered the English language.

Episcopal ministry

Bishop of Brownsville
On April 14, 1966, Medeiros was appointed Bishop of Brownsville, Texas, by Pope Paul VI. He received his episcopal ordination on June 9 from Bishop James Louis Connolly, with bishops James Joseph Gerrard and Gerald Vincent McDevitt serving as co-consecrators, at St. Mary's Cathedral.

His appointment to the Southern Texas diocese came at the time of a threatened farm workers' strike. Many of the lay faithful of the diocese were Mexican-American migrant workers. Medeiros was an advocate on behalf of workers, supporting their demands for a minimum wage at $1.25 an hour. He also became known as an outspoken opponent of capitalism, denouncing an economic system that "considers profit the key motive for economic progress, competition the maximum law of economics, and private ownership of the means of production an absolute right that carries no corresponding social obligations."

During his tenure, Medeiros sold the episcopal limousine, converted all but one room of the episcopal residence into a dormitory for visiting priests, and often traveled with migrant workers to celebrate Mass in the fields during the harvest season. He spent Christmas and Easter visiting prisoners in Texas jails. He also served as the chaplain of the Texas state council of the Knights of Columbus.

Archbishop of Boston
Medeiros was appointed Archbishop of Boston on September 8, 1970 at the request of and in succession to Richard Cushing. He was installed on October 7 of that year. The appointment of Medeiros, a Portuguese-American, surprised Irish Catholics in Boston, as the Irish had long dominated the local clergy and some Irish Catholics in Boston looked down on the Portuguese as "third-class Catholics".  In the days leading up to and following Medeiros' arrival, local Catholic institutions were targeted by vandals on several occasions. In one instance a cross was burned on the lawn of the diocese's chancery.

In 1971, Medeiros described abortion as "the new barbarism". As in Brownsville, he became an advocate for the poor: his Pastoral Letter "Man's Cities God's Poor" Boston 1972 reflects his passion for the poor. An opponent of the Vietnam War, the Archbishop condemned the bombing of Hanoi in a 1972 Christmas homily.

Pope Paul VI created him Cardinal Priest of Santa Susanna in the consistory of March 5, 1973. Medeiros pleaded with the Vatican to lift the excommunication of the Rev. Leonard Feeney, SJ, who disobeyed Church authority and took a strict interpretation of the doctrine of Extra Ecclesiam nulla salus. In 1974, the Cardinal refused to allow the baptism of the child of a Marlboro woman who supported the establishment of an abortion-information clinic. He strongly supported integration in the United States but not desegregation via busing. He refused to let parents enroll their children in parochial schools as a means of avoiding it. In May 1976, he spoke out against the racism in South Boston but apologized the following week. He served as a special papal envoy to the celebration of the 60th anniversary of the apparitions of Our Lady of Fátima in Portugal in May 1977.

Medeiros was one of the cardinal electors who participated in the conclaves of August and October 1978, which selected Popes John Paul I and John Paul II, respectively. Following John Paul I's sudden death, he said, "I've been trying to say to God, 'It's your doing, and I must accept it. Before the primaries for the 1980 congressional elections, Medeiros issued a pastoral letter that stated, "Those who make abortion possible by law cannot separate themselves from the guilt which accompanies this horrendous crime and deadly sin." His words were considered to be directed at pro-choice candidates James Michael Shannon and Barney Frank, and criticized by some as violating the separation of church and state.

Medeiros died from heart failure during open heart surgery in Boston, at age 67. He was laid to rest at his request with his parents in Saint Patrick's Cemetery in his hometown of Fall River. Massachusetts Governor (and future Democratic presidential nominee) Michael Dukakis described him as a "gentle, compassionate man".

Legacy
The Cardinal Medeiros Trust fund was created in 1981 by the Texas Knights of Columbus State Council Charities in his honor to provide educational grants to families of Knights.

Boston College named the freshman honors dormitory "Medeiros" in his honor. Cardinal Medeiros Avenue in Cambridge, Massachusetts, is named after him.

The main auditorium of the Catholic University of Portugal's campus in Lisbon is named in his honor. A statue on his honor was inaugurated in his home parish of Arrifes on 10 June 2000, at the Portugal Day.

Honours
 Grand-Cross of the Order of Christ, Portugal (3 March 1972)
 Grand-Cross of the Order of Prince Henry, Portugal (21 May 1972)

References

External links
Roman Catholic Diocese of Brownsville 
Roman Catholic Archdiocese of Boston

1915 births
1983 deaths
American people of Azorean descent
Portuguese emigrants to the United States
20th-century American cardinals
People from Fall River, Massachusetts
Burials in Massachusetts
Cardinals created by Pope Paul VI
Catholic University of America alumni
Roman Catholic archbishops of Boston
B.M.C. Durfee High School alumni
American people of Portuguese descent